Einar Thomassen (born 25 April 1951) is a Norwegian religious studies scholar.

Career
Thomassen was in Bergen, and grew up in Laksevåg. He was taught Coptic, Greek and Latin already during Bergen Cathedral School. He studied in Sweden, France, and Scotland. He took the mag.art. degree at the University of Bergen, and the PhD at the University of St. Andrews.

Thomassen is a professor at the University of Bergen, and also an adjunct professor at the University of Aarhus. He lectures in Christianity, Islam, Religion of the Antique and Classical World, pre-Islamic Middle-East, Syncretism, and Method.

He is a member of the Norwegian Academy of Science and Letters.

Selected writings in English
The tripartite tractate from Nag Hammadi (1982)
The Platonic and the Gnostic "Demiurge" (1993)
The Letters of Ahmad Ibn Idris (1993)
"Musings on 'syncretism'" (2004)
Religious Education in a Pluralistic Society: Experiences from Norway (2006)
The Spiritual Seed: the church of the 'Valentinians' (2006)

Festschrifts

Personal life
He lives in Bønes with his wife, whom he met while studying religious studies in the 1970s. They have two sons.

References

https://web.archive.org/web/20070111072458/http://www.hf.uib.no/i/religion/tilsette/thomassen.html
http://www.ba.no/puls/article2046817.ece

1951 births
Living people
People educated at the Bergen Cathedral School
University of Bergen alumni
Academic staff of the University of Bergen
Academic staff of the University of Oslo
Coptologists
Historians of Gnosticism
Members of the Norwegian Academy of Science and Letters